Another Journal Entry is the second studio album released by the Christian pop/rock group BarlowGirl. The album was released on September 27, 2005. Two of the songs are covers: "Enough" was originally sung by Chris Tomlin, while "No One Like You" was originally sung by the David Crowder Band. The hit "Never Alone" from their debut album returns on this sophomore album in an acoustic mix.

Background 
BarlowGirl published the lyrics for "Thoughts of You" on its website on June 4, 2003, with the lyrics featuring a different order compared to the final version. Of the eight songs listed on the site, it is the sole to be included on Another Journal Entry, as five were included on BarlowGirl and two remain unreleased to this day. Another Journal Entry was recorded in January and February 2005, and although the album would only be released later that year, the band's cover of "Enough" by Chris Tomlin was first included on the Absolute Modern Worship compilation album on January 25, 2005. This cover would also later be released as a radio single in 2006.

Reception 
In 2006, the album was nominated for a Dove Award for Rock/Contemporary Album of the Year at the 37th GMA Dove Awards. The song "Let Go" was also nominated for Rock Recorded Song of the Year. By August 4, 2007, the album sold 278,000 copies in its various editions.

Expanded edition 
An expanded edition was released on August 29, 2006. It added a cover of "For the Beauty of the Earth" with significant lyrical changes. A nativity version of the cover for the film The Nativity Story was released for the Christmas and holiday season and became a top 20 hit following its radio release on December 15, 2006. It also features three acoustic tracks, previously exclusive to Sony Connect. Concluding the album is a radio edit of "Never Alone", removing 20 seconds of instrumentals from the album version. The disc also includes the music video for "Never Alone", which features the unedited song in a low-definition QuickTime version. A "Fan Pack" variant of the expanded edition was also released, bundling a bonus More Than Music book and BarlowGirl sticker with the album.

Track listing

References 

2005 albums
BarlowGirl albums